Thomas Atherton Powys, 3rd Baron Lilford (2 December 1801 – 15 March 1861), was a British peer and Whig politician.

Lilford was the son of Thomas Powys, 2nd Baron Lilford, and Henrietta Maria Atherton of Atherton Hall. He succeeded his father as third Baron Lilford in 1825. In 1837 he was appointed a Lord-in-waiting (government whip in the House of Lords) in the Whig administration of Lord Melbourne, a post he held until the government fell in August 1841. He never returned to office.

Lord Lilford married Mary Elizabeth Fox, daughter of Henry Vassall-Fox, 3rd Baron Holland, and Lady Holland, in 1830, and had ten children. He inherited Lilford Hall in Northamptonshire from his father in 1825. In 1860, he inherited Bank Hall in Bretherton, Lancashire, on the death of his brother-in-law George Anthony Legh Keck. A year after inheriting he died in March 1861, aged 59, and was succeeded by his eldest son Thomas, a prominent ornithologist. Lady Lilford died in 1891.

References
Notes

Kidd, Charles, Williamson, David (editors). Debrett's Peerage and Baronetage (1990 edition). New York: St Martin's Press, 1990.

1801 births
1861 deaths
Thomas 3
Whig (British political party) Lords-in-Waiting